Vikøy is a village in Kvam municipality in Vestland county, Norway.

The village is the site of the Vikøy Church.  It is also where the old Vikøy Stave Church stood for several centuries until 1863 when it was torn down.  The municipality of Kvam was historically called Vikør, named after this village since it was the site of the local church.  The spelling was later changed to Vikøy.  The old vicarage at Vikøy is now a museum.  One of the buildings is called "Borgstova".  The museum is open on Wednesdays in the summer.  You can often find characters dressed in period clothing cooking krotekaker on those days.

References

Villages in Vestland
Kvam